Uncial 0175 (in the Gregory-Aland numbering), is a Greek uncial manuscript of the New Testament, dated palaeographically to the 5th century The manuscript has survived in a very fragmentary condition.

Description 

The codex contains a small part of the Acts of the Apostles 6:7-15, on one parchment leaf (17 cm by 12 cm). The text is written in one column per page, 20 lines per page, in uncial letters. 

The Greek text of this codex is a representative of the Alexandrian text-type. Aland placed it in Category II. 

Currently it is dated by the INTF to the 5th century.

The codex currently is housed at the Laurentian Library (PSI 125) in Florence.

See also 

 List of New Testament uncials
 Textual criticism

References

Further reading 
 Publicazioni della Societa Italiana (Papiri Greci e Latini) II, 125, ed. G. Vitelli.
 G. Cavallo, Ricerche sulla maiuscola biblica (Firenze: Le Monnier 1967), p. 115.

External links 
 Biblioteca Medicea Laurenziana

Greek New Testament uncials
5th-century biblical manuscripts